Jeevakke Jeeva is a 1981 Indian Kannada-language film, directed by K. S. R. Das and produced by S. V. Srikanth. The film stars Anant Nag, Shankar Nag, Saritha and Dwarakish. The film has musical score by Rajan–Nagendra.

Cast

Soundtrack
The music was composed by Rajan–Nagendra.

References

1980s Kannada-language films
Films directed by K. S. R. Das
Films scored by Rajan–Nagendra